Coleophora macilenta is a moth of the family Coleophoridae. It is found in southern Russia and Mongolia.

The larvae feed on the leaves of Ceratoides eversmanniana and Ceratoides papposa.

References

macilenta
Moths described in 1972
Moths of Asia